The Survivors Trust is a national umbrella agency for over 125 specialist voluntary sector agencies throughout the UK and Ireland providing a range of counselling, therapeutic and support services working with women, men and children who are victims/survivors of rape, sexual violence and sexual abuse. The organisation aims to offer a national collective voice to support and empower survivor groups, to educate and inform acknowledgment of and response to sexual abuse on a local and national level.

About 
The Survivors Trust originated in 1999/2000, when key individuals within five specialist support agencies began to actively seek a peer group.

The Survivors Trust became a registered charity in 2005 and since then has continued to develop new partnerships and to work at a national level. As at 2008, The Survivors Trust has over 120 member groups.

As a charitable organisation The Survivors Trust has received funding from the Victims Fund and the UK Government to carry out its work, among other sources. The UK Government Home Office has also recognised The Survivors Trust as one of the main umbrella groups which provides support to the sexual violence and abuse voluntary sector in the UK and representatives from The Survivors Trust sit on the Stakeholder Advisory Group on Sexual Violence and Abuse, an advisory group to the UK Government.

Core aims 

The main aims of The Survivors Trust are to support and empower survivors of rape, sexual violence and/or childhood sexual abuse by:

 Providing a collective voice and peer networking for members;
 Raising awareness about sexual abuse and/or rape and its effects on survivors, their supporters and society at large;
 Informing acknowledgement of, and effective responses to, rape and sexual abuse on a local, regional and national level.

External links 
 The Survivors Trust, Official website of The Survivors Trust
 Directory and Books Services (DABS), DABS is a specialist book and information service for people who are overcoming childhood abuse, sexual abuse, or domestic violence, and for those who live or work with survivors.

References 

Counseling organizations
Sexual abuse advocacy and support groups
Organisations based in Warwickshire
Rape in the United Kingdom
Rape in the Republic of Ireland